A Curfew Pass or Movement and Curfew Pass is a document issued by an empowered authority such as police or military for public officials or civilians to travel within or to and from an area under an imposed curfew by the said authority.

References

Government documents
Legal documents
International travel documents
National security